Destiny Times Three is an alternate timeline 1945 science fiction novel by American writer Fritz Leiber. It first appeared in Astounding Science Fiction in March and April 1945. In 1952 it featured in Five Science Fiction Novels published by Gnome Press. Its first appearance as a standalone novel came in 1957 when published by Galaxy Science Fiction Novels.

Plot summary
The Probability Engine made differing timelines a reality: alternate universes real enough to exist side by side – and to be invaded...

References

External links 
 

Novels by Fritz Leiber
1945 American novels
1945 science fiction novels
Alternate history novellas
Works originally published in Analog Science Fiction and Fact
Novels first published in serial form